The Party of Alenka Bratušek (SAB) was a political party in Slovenia. The party was founded on 31 May 2014 as the Alliance of Alenka Bratušek (ZaAB). The party was formed by Alenka Bratušek, who resigned as Prime Minister of Slovenia on 5 May 2014, and other former members of Positive Slovenia.

Among the founding members were incumbent MPs Maša Kociper, Jerko Čehovin, Jani Möderndorfer, Maja Dimitrovski, former MP Peter Vilfan, ministers Roman Jakič and Metod Dragonja. Present were also several guests: former Mercator retail group chief executive Miran Goslar, Verjamem party leader Igor Šoltes, MEP Tanja Fajon and Social Democrat MP Matjaž Han, Zares party president Darja Radić and the Democratic Party of Pensioners of Slovenia's Gorazd Žmauc.

The party won 4.34% of the vote in 13 July 2014's Slovenian parliamentary election  - and four seats in parliament.

On 21 November 2014, the party became a full member of the Alliance of Liberals and Democrats for Europe grouping in the European Parliament.

On 21 May 2016 the party was renamed to the Alliance of Social-Liberal Democrats. On 7 October 2017, the party again changed its title to include the founder's name in preparation for the upcoming parliamentary elections, becoming the Party of Alenka Bratušek. The party's Secretary General Jernej Pavlič stated that the name was changed to improve name recognition.

In the 3 June 2018 parliamentary election, the party garnered 5.11% of the vote and won five MP seats. In the 2022 Slovenian parliamentary election, the party failed to win any seats in the National Assembly. Subsequently, the party members voted in June 2022 to merge with the Freedom Movement that won the election. The Freedom Movement voted in favor of the merger on 27 June, with the official merger completed on 12 July.

Leadership
 President
 Alenka Bratušek

 Vice-Presidents
Maša Kociper
Tatjana Voj
Slavko Šterman

 Party Council
Members elected in 2014 included Metod Dragonja, Roman Jakič, Jani Möderndorfer and Stojan Pelko.

 Supervisory board
Members elected in 2014 included Nika Poglajen, Tatjana Voj, Dejan Radunić.

Electoral results

National Assembly

European Parliament

References

External links

2014 establishments in Slovenia
Alliance of Liberals and Democrats for Europe Party member parties
Centrist parties in Slovenia
Liberal parties in Slovenia
Organizations based in Ljubljana
Political parties established in 2014
Political parties disestablished in 2022
Pro-European political parties in Slovenia
Social liberal parties